Sases, also known as Gondophares IV Sases (Kharosthi: 𐨒𐨂𐨡𐨂𐨥𐨪 𐨯𐨯), was an Indo-Parthian king who ruled in northwestern parts of India in modern Pakistan. He is only known from coins and ruled for at least 26 years during the mid-1st century CE.

Sases apparently succeeded Abdagases in Sindh and Gandhara, and at some point during his reign assumed the name/title Gondophares, which was held by the supreme Indo-Parthian rulers. His coins show the Greek deity Zeus, forming a benediction sign (possibly Vitarka mudra), and incorporate the Buddhist symbol of the triratana.

With the modern datings supplied by Robert Senior, Gondophares IV is a likely candidate for several possible historical references to Indo-Parthian kings of the 1st century AD. Traditionally, these references have been thought to be about Gondophares I, as earlier scholars did not realise that "Gondophares" became a title after the death of this king, just as the name of the first emperor, Augustus, in the Roman Empire, was used by all later emperors as a title.

Tradition of a visit by St. Thomas

 
One Gondophares is connected to St Thomas in early Christian traditions embodied in the Acts of Thomas. In it Thomas was sold in Syria to Habban, an envoy of Gondophares, and travelled in slavery by sea to India, was presented to Gondophares to undertake the erection of the building the king required:
"According to the lot, therefore, India fell unto Judas Thomas... And while he thus spake and thought, it chanced that there was there a certain merchant come from India whose name was Abbanes, sent from the King Gundaphorus, and having commandment from him to buy a carpenter and bring him unto him." Acts of Thomas, I, 1-2 
"Now when the apostle was come into the cities of India with Abbanes the merchant, Abbanes went to salute the king Gundaphorus, and reported to him of the carpenter whom he had brought with him. And the king was glad, and commanded him to come in to him." Acts of Thomas I, 17 

Thomas instead spent all the king's money on alms, and as a consequence was imprisoned by him. Allegedly, Gondophares ultimately rehabilitated Thomas and recognized the validity of Christianity.

Passing on to the realm of another king, named in the Syrian versions as "Mazdai" (thought to refer to the Kushan king Vasudeva), he allegedly suffered martyrdom before being redeemed.  St Thomas thereafter went to Kerala and baptized the natives, whose descendants form the Saint Thomas Christians.

The magnificent cathedral at Troyes in France is famous for its exquisite architecture and magnificent stained glass windows, one of which, apparently, has a representation of the famous Indo-Parthian king Gondophares.

The material of much of the Acts as well as some of its unmistakably unorthodox theology, made its historicity dismissible for many centuries. "Gondophares" was dismissed as an invention. Then in 1854 General Alexander Cunningham reported (Journal of the Asiatic Society of Bengal vol.xxiii. pp. 679–712) that since the British had been in Afghanistan an estimated 30,000 coins bearing Greek and Indian legends had been found in Afghanistan and the Punjab. The mintings covered three centuries after the conquests of Alexander: coins in the hoards were minted for Scythian conquerors and for Parthian kings such as Gondophares, who thereby emerged from pious legend into history (Medlycott 1905), even though most of these coins belonged to the first Gondophares. Cunningham said that these coins were "highly interesting" on account of "the strong probability that this Gondophares is identical with the king Gandaforus who put Saint Thomas to death". He went on to say:

The great power of Gondophares, and discovery of a coin of Artabanus countermarked with the peculiar monograph of all the Gondopharian dynasty, make it highly probable that the Indo-Parthian Abdagases was the same as the Parthian chief, whose revolt is recorded by Tacitus (Annal. XV.-2) and Josephus (Antiqua. XX. iii.-2). This surmise is very much strengthened by the date of the revolt, A.D. 41, which would make Gondophares a contemporary of Saint Thomas.

Phraotes

It has also been suggested that one Gondophares may be identical with Phraotes, a Greek-speaking Indo-Parthian king of the city of Taxila, met by the Greek philosopher Apollonius of Tyana around 46 CE according to the Life of Apollonius Tyana written by Philostratus. The Gondophares who fits this date is Gondophares IV Sases. Like the Acts of Thomas it is doubted if there is any truth in the story given by Philostratus, and most scholars see Phroates as a stock name deployed by Philostratus in what is otherwise an opportunity for him to deploy his sophist training.

References

Indo-Parthian kings
1st-century monarchs in Asia
1st-century Iranian people